Lugotorix was a British chieftain who was captured after a failed attack by the four kings of Kent on Julius Caesar's naval camp in 54 BC. His name may mean "mouse-king".

References
Julius Caesar, De Bello Gallico 5:22
John Koch (1987), "A Window into the Welsh Iron Age: Manawydian, Mandubracios", Cambridge Medieval Celtic Studies 14 pp 17–52

External links
Cantiaci at Roman-Britain.org
Cantium at Romans in Britain

Briton rulers
Briton kings involved in Julius Caesar's invasions of Britain
Celtic warriors
1st-century BC rulers in Europe